{{Infobox film
| name           = Gadar: Ek Prem Katha
| image          = Gadar - Ek Prem Katha (movie poster).jpg
| caption        = Poster
| image_size     = 
| director       = Anil Sharma
| producer       = Nittin KeniBhanwar SinghBhaumik Gondaliya
| writer         = Shaktiman Talwar
| screenplay     = 
| story          = 
| based_on       = 
| starring       = 
| narrator       = Om Puri
| music          = Uttam Singh
| cinematography = Najeeb Khan
| editing        = A. D. DhanashekharanKeshav NaiduArun V. Narvekar
| studio         = Zee Telefilms
| distributor    = Zee Telefilms
| released       = {{Film date|2001|06|15|'=y}}
| runtime        = 170 minutes
| country        = India
| language       = Hindi
| budget         = ₹190 million(₹19 crore
| gross          = ₹1.33 billion(₹ 133 crore)
}}Gadar: Ek Prem Katha' is a 2001 Indian Hindi-language romantic period action drama film directed by Anil Sharma and set during the Partition of India in 1947. Loosely based on the life of Boota Singh, the film stars Sunny Deol and Amisha Patel in lead roles alongside Amrish Puri and Lillete Dubey. Sharma's son Utkarsh as a child artist plays Deol and Patel's son, before his first film as an adult, another Sharma directorial Genius (2018). Patel bagged Sakeena's role out of 500 girls who auditioned for the role.

(1994). Gadar: Ek Prem Katha is the second most-watched Hindi film in India since the 1990s, recording more than 50 million footfalls in India. The shy role of Deol was praised, earning him a Best Actor nomination at the ceremony of 47th Filmfare Awards, while Patel garnered the Filmfare Special Award as well as a nomination for Best Actress in the same function. As of 2014, it has been one of the must-watch Bollywood films on the Partition of India.

 Plot 
During the Partition of India, the film tells the story of a truck driver, Tara Singh (Sunny Deol), a Jat Sikh, who falls in love with a Muslim girl, Sakina '' Sakku'' Ali (Ameesha Patel), belonging to an aristocratic family.

The story begins with Sikhs and Hindus being attacked by Muslims in Pakistan when migrating to India by train from the railway station in West Punjab, Pakistan. In response, Sikhs and Hindus reply by killing Muslims migrating to Pakistan from East Punjab, India. During the Hindu-Muslim riots that erupted soon after the Partition, Tara also plans to kill Muslims. Still, he stops after recognising Sakina at the railway station, from the little Taj Mahal antique in her hands. He saves and protects her from a murderous mob chasing her because she failed to get onto the train with her family members after being lost in the crowd. As the mob attempts to rape and murder her brutally, Tara Singh defends Sakina by applying blood (implying sindoor) to her forehead to make her his Sikh Wife.

While driving back to Tara's house, the story has a major flashback showing Tara and Sakina's relationship during her college days. Still, the real ambition of Tara is to become a singer. Some girls in college who are friends of Sakina fool Tara to think that they have got him a spot on a music show in return for a favour. Tara performs badly in front of the music teacher, portrayed by Sakina. His friend then gives him tablets that help him prove his singing skills. Soon after, it is shown that Sakina is not the real music teacher, which saddens him. When performing on the music show, Sakina announces that she will not do her act, instead giving Tara a chance to sing despite being against the seniors' will at the college. Tara impresses everybody with his talent. While returning home after completing the final year, Sakina is given a goodbye present, the little Taj Mahal antique by Tara.

Later, Tara's parents, Jaideep Singh, and two sisters are seen weeping in Pakistan as they did not return to Amritsar before the partition. Tara's Muslim friend meets the family and requests them to stay with him as parents love both friends equally (like sons). But Tara's parents and sisters disagree. They reluctantly decide to leave. While leaving for the station, Tara's father and mother give their daughters two paper pouches. The bewildered twins ask them what that is. Father says that the sisters should not hesitate to give up their lives lest any Muslim attacks and shatters them and their dignity. Then the family reaches the station and boards the train. After some time, a large Muslim mob attacks the whole train consisting of Hindu and Sikh refugees. People run to save themselves, but they are killed gruesomely. Tara's sister hastily tries to eat the poison, but two men throw it from their hands and kill them after cruel physical abuse. The train, which was full of dead bodies of Hindus and Sikhs, has just arrived at Amritsar station, East Punjab. Tara, along with other Hindus and Sikhs waiting to pick up their relatives at the station, saw that their relatives were slaughtered inside the train. By seeing it, the Hindus and Sikhs formed a strong squad in East Punjab and retaliated in the same manner along with Tara Singh and massacred every Muslim in Amritsar station trying to flee to Pakistan.

Subsequently, and back in the present, they reach Tara's house. He explains his applying sindoor doesn't mean anything as he did this only to save her life, and she is safe there at his house. Also, he explains that he understands there is a huge difference between them as she is stunning and rich. After learning from the local railway station about her parents' demise, Sakina starts living in Tara's house. After overhearing Tara's aunt's comments about how society is reacting towards Tara's family that he is keeping a Muslim (outcast according to them), she insists Tara take her to a Muslim refugee camp as she doesn't want to overburden him anymore. Before Tara and Sakina head out towards Lahore, Sakina  insists that she had learned about Tara's love for her by reading his secret diary but doesn't say anything. After reaching the border and realizing her love for him, she proposes to him for marriage. They get married and become parents of a baby boy named Jeete. Their life seems like a bed of roses until Sakina sees an old newspaper during Holi festival that has a photograph of her father, Ashraf Ali (Amrish Puri) indicating that her parents are alive.

Her father is now the mayor of Lahore. When Sakina calls him from the Pakistani Embassy in Delhi, he arranges to fly her to Lahore. However, Tara and their son, who is supposed to accompany her to Lahore, are told at the last minute that their visa formalities have not been completed, which compels them to stay in India. Sakina leaves with a heavy heart. She meets her whole clan back in Lahore. Everyone is thrilled to see her. Later, when she wants to return to India, her mom tells her that she was about to be disowned as people were babbling about her staying with an Indian Jat. Her father, too, relates all of their hardships during the journey from India to Pakistan. Sakina is hurt and heart-broken. But she starts protesting when her parents' friends start using her post-marriage life as a publicity stunt and depict her in-laws badly to extract more sympathy and votes from the Pakistani population. Later she is introduced to a very handsome guy who hails from a very influential rich family. She is told that she would be marrying him. But Sakina refuses and even asks the Qazi Saheb to leave her alone, saying second marriage during the husband's lifetime is a sin. Her parents and Mamaji are irate about that. They forcibly lock her up in a room inside the palace.

After learning they will not get a visa, Tara and his son, accompanied by a friend, enter Pakistan illegally at the border. Tara tries to take shelter in his old friend's house but hearing his wife fight about that. He leaves the place with his son Jeet and his assistant. There they find out that Sakina is getting married and reach her before the marriage takes place. Mother and son reunite happily. A fight is about to break out when the priest stops them, as this can end up harming Sakina's father's career in politics. Ashraf Ali agrees to their marriage under two conditions: they should live in Pakistan, and Tara should convert to Islam. These conditions are accepted by Tara in public the next day, which was against Ashraf Ali's plans. He makes Tara insult his country to prove that he is a true Pakistani, which enrages him, and this makes him kill some member of the large mob that Ashraf hired to kill him. Tara, Sakina, their son, and a friend manage to escape. Tara and Sakina escape from the city and hide in a poor couple's cottage near the border forest. But the man's wife is a greedy woman who wants all of Sakina's ornaments for herself. She refuses to listen to her husband and tries to throw Sakina out of the house when she does not get more jewelry.

But after Sakina leaves with Jeet and Tara, Ashraf Ali reaches the cottage and relocates his daughter. After a long period of turmoil, they catch a cotton mill train bound for India. Ashraf Ali finds out, and he takes some men to stop them. In the ensuing fight, Sakina gets shot by her own father. In the hospital, Sakina has lapsed into a coma. She gains consciousness after having a nightmare. The movie ends with Ashraf Ali accepting Tara as his son-in-law, and they return to India.

 Cast 

Sunny Deol as Tara Singh
Ameesha Patel as Sakeena "Sakku" Ali Singh, Tara Singh's wife
Amrish Puri as Mayor Ashraf Ali, Sakeena's father and Tara Singh's father-in-law
Lillete Dubey as Shabana Ali, Sakeena's mother and Tara Singh's mother-in-law
Vivek Shauq as Darmiyaan Singh, Tara Singh's best friend
Utkarsh Sharma as Charanjeet "Jeete" Singh, Tara Singh and Sakeena's son
Suresh Oberoi as Taya, Kulwant Singh, Tara Singh's elder uncle
Madhu Malti as Gurjeet Singh, Tara Singh's elder aunt
Pramod Moutho as Gurdeep Singh, Tara Singh's father
Kanika Shivpuri as Parmeet Singh, Tara Singh's mother
Mushtaq Khan as Gulraaz Khan
Dolly Bindra as Samira Khan
Arjun Dwivedi as Pak Jailor 
Ahsaan Khan as Abdul Ali
Tony Mirchandani as Sarfaraz Ali
Samar Jai Singh as Salim Ali
Gyan Prakash as Wali Mohammed
Vikrant Chaturvedi as Kalim
Rakesh Bedi as Chandrakant Vaidya
Vishwajeet Pradhan as Daroga Suleiman
Ishrat Ali as Qazi of Ali family
Mithilesh Chaturvedi as Idris, Editor of Jung daily newspaper.
B.N. Sharma as Iqbal, Officer of Pakistan High Consulate in Delhi
Pratima Kazmi as Greedy Woman
Amita Khopkar as Bano
Santosh Gupta as Chanta
Abhay Bhargava as Indian Army Officer
Shweta Shinde as Sakina Friend, girls Boarding Hostel
Om Puri as the narrator

 Production 
Kajol was offered the role of Sakeena, but she turned it down as she didn't feel the movie was her type of film.

A part of Gadar: Ek Prem Katha was shot at Bishop Cotton School, Shimla and at other several locations in Shimla. A part of it was also shot in Sacred Heart Senior Secondary School, Dalhousie. Although the film was set in 1947, it features the music of "Que sera sera" which was first published in 1956.

The movie was also shot in the city of Lucknow & Rudauli, Uttar Pradesh where the city was depicted as Lahore, Pakistan, and parts were shot at La Martiniere Boys School, Lucknow. Some parts were shot at Irshad Manzil Palace, Rudauli, Uttar Pradesh. A significant part was shot in Pathankot, Sarna and Amritsar to depict the division-torn country.

 Reception 
Ruchi Sharma of Rediff.com said that "Gadar - Ek Prem Katha comes close to being fantastic, even though it is overheated in bits. Not to miss, this". Film critic Taran Adarsh opined that "On the whole, GADAR is worth the watch for its brilliant dramatic and confrontation sequences, splendid performances and touching moments that overpower the two flaws in the film ? the excessive length (the narrative needs to be trimmed by at least 15 minutes in the second half!) and a weak musical score".

It was declared an All-Time Blockbuster by Box Office India. Gadar: Ek Prem Katha ranks among the top 3 Indian films in all-time highest footfalls since 1990s. In the United Kingdom, Gadar: Ek Prem Katha grossed around £280,000.

 Soundtrack 

The music of Gadar: Ek Prem Katha was composed by Uttam Singh. Lyrics (all songs) were written by Anand Bakshi.

According to the Indian trade website Box Office India, the soundtrack sold approximately 2.5 million copies.

 Awards 
Winner:
Filmfare Special Performance Award - Ameesha Patel
Filmfare Best Action Award - Tinnu Verma
Zee Cine Special Award for Outstanding Performance - Male - Sunny Deol
Star Screen Award for Best Actor - Sunny Deol
Sansui Best Actor Award - Sunny Deol
Sansui Best Actress Award - Ameesha Patel
Annual Filmgoers Awards - Best Actress - Ameesha Patel

Nominated:
Filmfare Best Film Award - Nitin Keni
Filmfare Best Director Award - Anil Sharma
Filmfare Best Actor Award - Sunny Deol
Filmfare Best Actress Award - Ameesha Patel
Filmfare Best Music Director Award - Uttam Singh
Filmfare Best Lyricist Award - Anand Bakshi
Filmfare Best Male Playback Award - Udit Narayan
Filmfare Best Villain Award - Amrish Puri
IIFA Best Movie Award - Nitin Keni
IIFA Best Director Award - Anil Sharma
IIFA Best Actor Award - Sunny Deol
IIFA Best Actress Award - Ameesha Patel
Star Screen Best Film Award - Nitin Keni
Star Screen Best Director Award - Anil Sharma
Star Screen Best Actress Award - Ameesha Patel
Zee Cine Award for Best Film - Nitin Keni
Zee Cine Award for Best Director - Anil Sharma
Zee Cine Award for Best Actor - Male - Sunny Deol
Zee Cine Award for Best Actor - Female - Ameesha Patel
Zee Cine Award for Best Actor in a Negative Role - Amrish Puri

 Sequel 

A sequel titled Gadar 2: The Katha Continues, was announced on 15 October 2021 with the release of a motion poster starring Sunny Deol, Ameesha Patel and Utkarsh Sharma in the lead roles. Anil Sharma will direct the film sequel with Zee Studios producing the film. The film is slated to release on 11 August 2023.

 See also 
 List of highest-grossing Bollywood films
 Shaheed-e-Mohabbat Boota Singh'', 1999 Indian Punjabi-language film

References

Bibliography

External links 

 Gadar: Ek Prem Katha at Bollywood Hungama

2001 films
2000s Hindi-language films
2000s action drama films
Indian action drama films
Military of Pakistan in films
Indian historical action films
India–Pakistan relations in popular culture
Indian interfaith romance films
Films scored by Uttam Singh
Films set in the partition of India
Films set in Lahore
Films set in Punjab, India
Films set in Punjab, Pakistan
Films shot in Lucknow
Films shot in Punjab, India
Films shot in Himachal Pradesh
Films directed by Anil Sharma
2000s historical action films